Common Platform Enumeration (CPE) is a structured naming scheme for information technology systems, software, and packages. Based upon the generic syntax for Uniform Resource Identifiers (URI), CPE includes a formal name format, a method for checking names against a system, and a description format for binding text and tests to a name.

The CPE Product Dictionary provides an agreed upon list of official CPE names. The dictionary is provided in XML format and is available to the general public. The CPE Dictionary is hosted and maintained at NIST, may be used by nongovernmental organizations on a voluntary basis, and is not subject to copyright in the United States.

CPE identifiers are commonly used to search for Common Vulnerabilities and Exposures (CVEs) that affect the identified product.

Scheme Format 
The CPE follows this format, maintained by NIST:

cpe:<cpe_version>:<part>:<vendor>:<product>:<version>:<update>:<edition>:<language>:<sw_edition>:<target_sw>:<target_hw>:<other>

cpe_version 
The version of the CPE definition.  The latest CPE definition version is 2.3.

part 
May have 1 of 3 values:

 a for Applications
 h for Hardware
 o for Operating Systems

It is sometimes referred to as type.

vendor 
Values for this attribute SHOULD describe or identify the person or organization that manufactured or 
created the product. Values for this attribute SHOULD be selected from an attribute-specific valid-values 
list, which MAY be defined by other specifications that utilize this specification. Any character string 
meeting the requirements for WFNs (cf. 5.3.2) MAY be specified as the value of the attribute.

product 
The name of the system/package/component. product and vendor are sometimes identical.  It can not contain spaces, slashes, or most special characters. Also may not contain underscores and the hyphen/minus sign.

version 

The version of the system/package/component.

update 
This is used for update or service pack information. Sometimes referred to as "point releases" or minor versions. The technical difference between version and update will be different for certain vendors and products. Common examples include beta, update4, SP1, and ga (for General Availability), but it is most often left blank.

edition 
A further granularity describing the build of the system/package/component, beyond version.

language 

A valid language tag as defined by IETF RFC 4646 entitled "Tags for Identifying Languages". Examples include: en-us for US English, and zh-tw for Taiwanese Mandarin.

Examples 

Here, * is used as a wildcard character:

cpe:2.3:a:ntp:ntp:4.2.8:p3:*:*:*:*:*:*
cpe:2.3:o:microsoft:windows_7:-:sp2:*:*:*:*:*:*
cpe:2.3:a:microsoft:internet_explorer:8.0.6001:beta:*:*:*:*:*:*

References

External links 

 CPE Specification
 Official CPE Dictionary

Naming conventions